Marathon Man may refer to:

 Marathon Man (novel), a 1974 novel by William Goldman
 Marathon Man (film), a 1976 adaptation of the novel
 "Marathon Man", an episode of Forensic Files

People with the nickname
 Aaron Krickstein (born 1967), American former professional tennis player
 Glenn Strömberg (born 1960), Swedish former footballer

Songs
 "Marathon Man", by Akala from DoubleThink
 "Marathon Man", by Bear Hands from You'll Pay for This
 "Marathon Man", by David Arkenstone and Kostia, with David Lanz from The Spirit of Olympia
 "Marathon Man", by Eric Carmen from Boats Against the Current
 "Marathon Man", by Ian Brown from My Way
 "Marathon Man", by K-the-I??? from Yesterday, Today & Tomorrow
 "Marathon Man", by Wizzard from Introducing Eddy and the Falcons

See also 
 "Mr. Monk and the Marathon Man", an episode of Monk
 Eddie Izzard: Marathon Man, a 2010 television special featuring Eddie Izzard
 Pheidippides, central figure in the Marathon story